El Alamein is a town in the northern Matrouh Governorate of Egypt.

El Alamein may also refer to:
 First Battle of El Alamein
 Second Battle of El Alamein
 El Alamein (1953 film), an American war film
 El Alamein: The Line of Fire, a 2002 Italian war-drama film
El Alamein: Battles in North Africa, 1942, a 1973 board wargame about the World War II North African camapign